Mariner Mountain is a mountain on the west coast of Vancouver Island, British Columbia, Canada, located  north of Tofino and  southwest of Mount Albert Edward.

See also
 List of mountains in Canada

References

Vancouver Island Ranges
One-thousanders of British Columbia
Clayoquot Land District